Libor Němeček (born 26 October 1968) is a former professional tennis player from the Czech Republic.

Career
Němeček had some success as a junior in his native country. He won the Czechoslovakian Under-14s Championship and was later the doubles winner with Cyril Suk at the Under-18s Championships.

In 1989 New South Wales Open, Němeček was a quarter-finalist, securing wins over Jan Gunnarsson and then world number 51 Magnus Gustafsson. He also reached the round of 16 in Kitzbuhel that year.

The Czechoslovak was runner-up at the U.S. Pro Tennis Championships in 1990, but the event was no longer part of the ATP Tour. After making it through qualifying, Nemecek lost in the opening round of the 1990 Australian Open to Canadian Andrew Sznajder, in four sets.

He made two further quarter-finals in his career, at Wellington in 1991 and Bordeaux in 1993.

Němeček is currently working as a tennis coach in Prague.

Challenger titles

Singles: (1)

References

External links
 
 

1968 births
Living people
Czechoslovak male tennis players
Czech male tennis players
People from Jablonec nad Nisou District
Sportspeople from the Liberec Region